Constable Burton Hall is a grade I-listed Georgian mansion of dressed stone in an extensive and well wooded park in the village of Constable Burton in North Yorkshire, and is privately owned by the Wyvill family. The house is a two-storey ashlar faced structure with a five bay frontage having an elegant recessed Ionic portico. The principal entrance is approached by a double flight of steps. The side elevation has a pediment and there is a large projecting bay to the rear of the house.

History

The estate came into the Wyvill family by marriage in the reign of Edward VI and a house was constructed in Elizabethan times to an H-shaped floor plan. In 1611 Marmaduke Wyvill was created a baronet. The house then passed down to the 7th Baronet, also Sir Marmaduke Wyvill, who in 1768 commissioned John Carr of York to renovate it in the Palladian style. The 7th Baronet was High Sheriff of Yorkshire for 1773 and died unmarried in 1774, causing the baronetcy to become dormant after its American heirs failed to claim the title. 

He left the estate to his cousin and brother-in-law, the Rev. Christopher Wyvill, from whom  it descended in turn via the latter's son Marmaduke, the MP for York, to Marmaduke's son, also Marmaduke (1815–1896). He represented Richmond  in Parliament for many years and was also a world class chess player. The current owner is his grandson, Charles Wyvill.

In 1984, the hall was listed as a grade II listed building. The pub in the village is called The Wyvill Arms.
The house and gardens are private. Please consult website www.constableburton.com for special events

Popular culture
In the 1945 film The Way to the Stars the hall was used as the United States Army Air Forces headquarters. Its exterior remains little changed today.

The hall was also featured in the British television series All Creatures Great and Small, in the episode "Be Prepared", as the home of Major Headingley.

References

External links
 Official website

Country houses in North Yorkshire
Grade I listed buildings in North Yorkshire
Gardens in North Yorkshire
Grade I listed houses